Commodore Clark  may refer to:

Sheldon Clark, Commodore of the Chicago Yacht Club
Edward Walter Clark, Commodore of the Philadelphia Corinthian Yacht Club

See also
Clark (surname)